The 2021 World Judo Juniors Championships was held between 6 and 10 October 2021 in Olbia, Italy. On its last day, the contest featured the 2021 World Juniors Mixed Team Championships.

Event videos
The event aired freely on the IJF YouTube channel.

Medalists

Men

Women

Mixed

Medal table

Prize money
The sums written are per medalist.

Participating nations
490 from 72 nations:

 (3)
 (5)
 (3)
 (8)
 (7)
 (2)
 (13)
 (4)
 (7)
 (1)
 (3)
 (1)
 (4)
 (7)
 (5)
 (2)
 (5)
 (5)
 (3)
 (18)
 (13)
 (16)
 (7)
 (8)
 (1)
 (1)
 (1)
 (1)
 (16)
 (2)
 (14)
 (11)
 (31)
 (17)
 (6)
 (2)
 (6)
 (8)
 (4)
 (3)
 (5)
 (16)
 (9)
 (4)
 (2)
 (10)
 (2)
 (4)
 (4)
 (4)
 (8)
 (2)
 (4)
 (9)
 (4)
 (18)
 (6)
 (2)
 (1)
 (3)
 (3)
 (4)
 (9)
 (3)
 (3)
 (7)
 (7)
 (11)
 (14)
 (17)
 (17)
 (4)

References

External links
 

 U21
World Championships, Junior
World Junior
World Judo Junior Championships